Almsworthy Common is a small area of unenclosed land in Exmoor, south-western England. It contains a number of archaeological sites.

It is about 2 miles north of Exford roughly 0.5 km2 in area, and the Macmillan Way West passes through it, as does the parish boundary between Exford and Porlock. It reaches a height of 453 metres.

Stone settings are arrangements of upright stones either scattered randomly or in a roughly geometric pattern. They are the most common form of stone monument found on Exmoor, with 57 conclusively recorded examples in this area. A large number are known to have existed but have been destroyed.

560 m south west of Chetsford Bridge is a stone alignment. The archaeologist Aubrey Burl stated that an "eye of faith" was needed to identify "either a ring or a set of rows."
The Ordnance Survey list it as a "Stone Circle" on their map. In his 1970 study of the archaeology of Exmoor, Leslie Grinsell thought that it was "probably" a stone circle.

The common is also the site of one of the best preserved hut circles on Exmoor.

References

Footnotes

Bibliography

External links

Almsworthy at The Megalithic Portal
Almsworthy at The Modern Antiquarian

Archaeological sites in Somerset
Buildings and structures in Somerset
Scheduled monuments in Somerset
History of Somerset
Megalithic monuments in England
Exmoor